Hostice may refer to:

Hostice, a village and municipality in the Rimavská Sobota District of the Banská Bystrica Region of Slovakia
Hostice (Šumperk District), a village in Šumperk District in Olomouc Region of the Czech Republic

See also
 Hoštice (disambiguation)